Todirești is a commune in Ungheni District, Moldova. It is composed of two villages, Grăseni and Todirești.

References

Communes of Ungheni District
Beletsky Uyezd